Saint Joseph Catholic Church in Hilo is a parish of the Roman Catholic Church of Hawaii in the United States.  Located at 43 Kapiolani Street, in Hilo on the Big Island of Hawaii, the church falls under the jurisdiction of the Diocese of Honolulu and its bishop.  It is named after Saint Joseph, foster father of Jesus.
This parish operates the St. Joseph Junior and Senior High School and an elementary school.

Across the street from the main church built in 1915 - 1917 is the Haili Church.

References
  

Joseph Catholic Church in Hilo, Saint
Religious buildings and structures in Hawaii County, Hawaii
Roman Catholic churches completed in 1917
1917 establishments in Hawaii
Buildings and structures in Hilo, Hawaii
20th-century Roman Catholic church buildings in the United States